Banda Uno is a Philippine movie made under LVN Pictures

Characters 
 Miniong Alvarez
 Alfonso Carvajal
 Bayani Casimiro
 Manding Claro
 Nenita Vidal

External links 
 

Philippine black-and-white films